A pithivier is a round, enclosed pie usually made by baking two disks of puff pastry, with a filling stuffed in between. It has the appearance of a hump and is traditionally decorated with spiral lines drawn from the top outwards with the point of a knife, and scalloping on the edge. It is named after the French town of Pithiviers, where the dish is commonly assumed to originate.

A small mound of filling is positioned at the centre of the underneath layer of pastry, rather than spread on it, so as to prevent it from leaking during baking. The pie is traditionally finished with a distinct shine to the top of the crust, by brushing on an egg wash beforehand, or by caramelising a dusting of confectioner's sugar at the end of baking, or both.

The filling of the pithivier is often a sweet frangipane (optionally combined with fruit such as cherry or plum), but savoury pies with vegetable, meat or cheese filling can also be called pithivier.

See also
 List of pies, tarts and flans
 List of French desserts

References

Pies
French pastries
Almond dishes
Holiday foods
Puff pastry